Eoophyla leucostrialis is a moth in the family Crambidae first described by George Hampson in 1906. It lives in Sierra Leone.

The wingspan is about 16 mm. The forewings are dark fuscous, irrorated (sprinkled) with white. The hindwings are whitish.

References

Eoophyla
Moths of Africa